Muj wydafca is an album by Kult, released on October 1, 1994.

Track listing
 all tracks by Kult (music) and Kazik Staszewski (lyrics) except where noted.
 "Ręce do góry" – 3:22 (Hands up)
 "Lewe lewe loff" – 3:54
 "Keszitsen kepet onmagarol" – 4:02
 "Onyx" – 4:50
 "Gaz na ulicach" – 2:22 (Gas on the Streets)
 "Oczy niebieskie" – 1:31 (Blue Eyes)
 "Pasażer" – 5:05 (The Passenger) (Iggy Pop)
 "Historia pewnej miłości" – 5:38 (The Story of a Certain Love)
 "Mój wydafca" – 5:39 (My Editor)
 "Kulcikriu" – 3:19
 "Bliskie spotkanie 3 stopnia" – 4:24 (Close Encounter of the 3rd Kind)
 "Krutkie kazanie na temat jazdy na maxa" – 3:29 (A Short Preaching About Partying to the Max)
 "Na zachód!" – 4:36 (To the West!)
 "Dziewczyna o perłowych włosach" – 4:35 (The Girl With the Pearly Hair) (Omega)
 "Psalm 151" – 5:51
 "Piosenka młodych wioślarzy" – 4:49 (The Song of Young Oarsmen)
 "Setka wódki" – 5:10 (100 ml of Vodka)

Credits
 Kazik Staszewski – lead vocalist, synthesizer;
 Janusz Grudziński – piano, keyboards, guitar;
 Krzysztof Banasik – French horn, guitar, keyboards;
 Piotr Morawiec – guitar; banjo;
 Ireneusz Wereński – bass guitar;
 Andrzej Szymańczak – drumset;
 Jerzy Pomianowski – tabla;
 Wojciech Przybylski – sound engineer;

References
 

Kult (band) albums
1994 albums